Joseph Peter Hinnigan (born 3 December 1955, in Liverpool) is an English former professional footballer. His clubs included Wigan Athletic, Sunderland, Preston North End, Gillingham, for whom he made over 100 Football League appearances, Wrexham and Chester City.

Playing career
Hinnigan joined Wigan Athletic from South Liverpool in August 1975 for a fee of £1,200. After initially struggling to make the first team at the club and being transfer-listed, he turned his career around and played in 120 Northern Premier League games before Wigan's election into the Football League.

As well as playing in Wigan's first ever Football League fixture, he was also the scorer of the club's first ever Football League goal, against Newport County on 2 September 1978. Hinnigan soon attracted the attention of bigger clubs and was signed by Sunderland for £130,000.

Post-playing career
After finishing his playing career in 1990, Hinnigan began the first of four spells as a physiotherapist and coach with Chester City. He also worked at Wigan Athletic, Rochdale and Bury (all alongside manager Graham Barrow), before moving from Chester to become physio at Shrewsbury Town in October 2006. He has been the physio at Accrington Stanley since 2008.

References

1955 births
Living people
English footballers
Gillingham F.C. players
Wigan Athletic F.C. players
Sunderland A.F.C. players
Wrexham A.F.C. players
Chester City F.C. players
Preston North End F.C. players
Association football defenders
English Football League players
South Liverpool F.C. players
Wigan Athletic F.C. non-playing staff
Chester City F.C. non-playing staff
Bury F.C. non-playing staff
Rochdale A.F.C. non-playing staff
Shrewsbury Town F.C. non-playing staff
Accrington Stanley F.C. non-playing staff
Association football physiotherapists
Footballers from Liverpool